The Cagayan Valley languages are a group of languages spoken in the Philippines. They are:
Isnag
Bayag
Calanasan
Dibagat-Kabugao
Karagawan
Talifugu-Ripang
Ibanagic
Adasen
Eastern Addasen
Western Addasen
Atta
Faire Atta
Pamplona Atta
Pudtol Atta
Ibanag
North Ibanag
South Ibanag
Malaweg
Gaddangic
Central Cagayan Agta
Itawit
Yogad
Cagayan-Baliwon Gaddang
Ga'dang
Gaddang

References

Robinson, Laura C. and Jason William Lobel (2013). "The Northeastern Luzon Subgroup of Philippine Languages." Oceanic Linguistics 52.1 (2013): 125-168.

 
Northern Luzon languages